Saratoga is the name of several unincorporated communities in the U.S. state of Virginia, United States.

Saratoga, Buckingham County, Virginia
Saratoga, Clarke County, Virginia
Saratoga, Fairfax County, Virginia